Angel Kelley (born 1967) is an American attorney and judge serving as a United States district judge of the United States District Court for the District of Massachusetts. She is a former associate justice of the Massachusetts Superior Court.

Education 

Kelley received her Bachelor of Arts from Colgate University in 1989, her Master of Laws in trial advocacy from Temple University in 2003, and her Juris Doctor from Georgetown University in 1992.

Legal and academic career 

Kelley began her legal career as a staff attorney at The Legal Aid Society in the Juvenile Rights Division in Brooklyn, New York from 1993 to 1997. From 1997 to 2005, she was an attorney for the Port Authority of New York and New Jersey. From 2007 to 2009, Kelley served as an Assistant United States Attorney for the United States Attorney's Office for the District of Massachusetts. From 1992 to 2005, she was a part-time instructor at Columbia University. From 2004 to 2005 she was a part-time instructor at New York University. From 2005 to 2007, she was a clinical instructor at Harvard Law School. Since 2012, she has been a part-time adjunct professor at Suffolk University Law School. Since 2016, she has been a volunteer instructor at Emory University School of Law and since 2018, she has been a part-time adjunct professor at Boston University School of Law.

Judicial career

State judicial service 
In 2009, she was appointed to the Massachusetts District Court by Governor Deval Patrick and sworn in on September 17, 2010. On January 4, 2013, she was nominated to be a judge of the Massachusetts Superior Court and confirmed to the position on January 24, 2013, in a 6–2 vote.

Federal judicial service 

On May 12, 2021, President Joe Biden nominated Kelley to serve as a United States district judge for the United States District Court for the District of Massachusetts to the seat vacated by Judge Douglas P. Woodlock, who assumed senior status on June 1, 2015. On June 23, 2021, a hearing on her nomination was held before the Senate Judiciary Committee. On July 22, 2021, her nomination was reported out of committee by a 15–7 vote. On September 14, 2021, the United States Senate invoked cloture on her nomination by a 52-43 vote. Her nomination was confirmed later that day by a 52–44 vote. She received her judicial commission on September 15, 2021, and was sworn in the same day. She is the second African American female judge and the second Asian American judge to serve on the U.S. District Court in Massachusetts.

See also 
 List of African-American federal judges
 List of African-American jurists

References

External links 

1967 births
20th-century American lawyers
20th-century American women lawyers
21st-century American judges
21st-century American lawyers
21st-century American women lawyers
21st-century American women judges
African-American judges
American jurists of Asian descent
Assistant United States Attorneys
Boston University School of Law faculty
Colgate University alumni
Columbia University faculty
Georgetown University Law Center alumni
Harvard Law School faculty
Judges of the United States District Court for the District of Massachusetts
Living people
Massachusetts lawyers
Massachusetts state court judges
New York University faculty
People from New Rochelle, New York
Suffolk University Law School faculty
Temple University Beasley School of Law alumni
United States district court judges appointed by Joe Biden
Emory University School of Law faculty